Hanne Sandstad (born 1970) is a Norwegian orienteering competitor and World Champion.

Career
At the 1991 World Orienteering Championships she won a silver medal in the relay, together with Heidi Arnesen, Ragnhild Bratberg and Ragnhild Bente Andersen. At the 1997 World Orienteering Championships she won silver medals in the short distance and the relay, and a bronze medal in the classic distance. She became World Champion in the relay in 1999, together with Birgitte Husebye, Elisabeth Ingvaldsen and Hanne Staff.

She represented the sports club NTHI.

References

External links
 
 

1970 births
Living people
Norwegian orienteers
Female orienteers
Foot orienteers
World Orienteering Championships medalists
20th-century Norwegian women
21st-century Norwegian women
Junior World Orienteering Championships medalists